The Wilson–Finney–Land House, at 1750 Bethany Rd. in Morgan County, Georgia near Madison, Georgia, was built in 1805.  It was listed on the National Register of Historic Places in 2004.

The listing also includes a garage and several contributing objects.

The main house was built as an I-house by James Wilson around 1805.  It was later owned and lived in by Abraham McAfee, who was a captain in the local militia and was the second sheriff of Morgan County.  A later owner named James Finney added Greek Revival and Italianate features to the house, including the front door surround and decorative brackets supporting the eaves.  A later later owner, Cincinnatus Land, added Craftsman details, including a wraparound porch with square columns on brick piers.

It was deemed "significant in the area of architecture as an excellent example of a house that has evolved over time to meet the needs of its occupants and the changing architectural styles."

References

Cotton plantations
Plantations in Georgia (U.S. state)
I-houses in Georgia (U.S. state)
National Register of Historic Places in Morgan County, Georgia
Greek Revival architecture in Georgia (U.S. state)
Italianate architecture in Georgia (U.S. state)
Buildings and structures completed in 1805